The 204–15 Basketligan season was the 22nd season of the Basketligan, the highest professional basketball league in Sweden. Södertälje Kings successfully defended their title by winning the Finals 4–1 over Uppsala.

Regular season

|}

Playoffs
Different from last year, the semi-finals were played in a best-of-seven format.

Awards

References

Basketligan seasons
Sweden
Basketligan